The Citation Style Language (CSL) is an open XML-based language to describe the formatting of citations and bibliographies. Reference management programs using CSL include Zotero, Mendeley and Papers.  The Pandoc lightweight document conversion system also supports citations in CSL, YAML, and JSON formats and can render these using any of the CSL styles listed in the Zotero Style Repository.

History

CSL was created by Bruce D'Arcus for use with OpenOffice.org, and an XSLT-based "CiteProc" CSL processor. CSL was further developed in collaboration with Zotero developer Simon Kornblith. Since 2008, the core development team consists of D'Arcus, Frank Bennett and Rintze Zelle.

The releases of CSL are 0.8 (March 21, 2009), 0.8.1 (February 1, 2010), 1.0 (March 22, 2010), and 1.0.1 (September 3, 2012). CSL 1.0 was a backward-incompatible release, but styles in the 0.8.1 format can be automatically updated to the CSL 1.0 format.

On its release in 2006, Zotero became the first application to adopt CSL. In 2008 Mendeley was released with CSL support, and in 2011, Papers and Qiqqa gained support for CSL-based citation formatting.

Software support

 Zotero, Mendeley, Papers, and Qiqqa all support CSL 1.0 (Zotero also supports CSL 0.8.1 styles, which are internally updated to CSL 1.0).
 Zotero, Mendeley, and Qiqqa rely on the citeproc-js JavaScript CSL processor.
 Zotero, Mendeley, and Qiqqa provide a built-in CSL editor to help create and modify CSL styles.

Styles

The CSL project maintains a CSL 1.0 style repository, which contains over 9000 styles (more than 1700 unique styles).

References

External links
 Project home of the Citation Style Language
 CSL 1.0.1 Specification
 Zotero's CSL documentation
 WYSIWYG CSL 1.0 style editor (in development, by Mendeley)

Metadata
Bibliography file formats
Library 2.0
Reference